Lee Yong-Gi (born May 30, 1985) is a South Korean football player who plays for Chungju Hummel.

External links
 

1985 births
Living people
Association football defenders
South Korean footballers
Gyeongnam FC players
Gimcheon Sangmu FC players
Chungju Hummel FC players
K League 1 players
K League 2 players
Footballers from Seoul
Yonsei University alumni